Chissamba is the site of a Protestant mission near an ombala or capital of a local kingdom located a few kilometers southeast of the town of Catabola, (formerly Nova Sintra), in the province of Bié in Angola.  It was established in 1886 as a joint effort of the United Church of Christ Congregational and the United Church of Canada.

The first physician at Chissamba was Dr Walter Currie who arrived in 1886. A Bible school was also started at the mission. For many years, from 1928 to 1967, the medical care was provided by Dr Walter Strangway and his wife Alice. They were joined by Dr. Elizabeth Bridgeman and Edith Radley. Dr. Elizabeth Bridgeman continued until after the start of the civil war when she and Edith Radley were forced to leave. The hospital and Bible school were destroyed during the civil war but efforts to rebuild were started. There have been some efforts to rebuild.

In memory of Dr Walter Strangway, Dr. Walter Strangway Provincial Hospital in Bie province was named after him by the government of Angola as recognition of his 40 years of good service.

Populated places in Bié Province